William Stanley Lloyd (1 October 1924 – 6 July 2011) was an English professional footballer who played as a winger.

He died in Cleethorpes, North Lincolnshire, in 2011, aged 86.

References

1924 births
2011 deaths
Footballers from County Durham
English footballers
Association football wingers
Sunderland A.F.C. players
Grimsby Town F.C. players
Worksop Town F.C. players
Scunthorpe United F.C. players
English Football League players
People from West Auckland